A stone run (called also stone river, stone stream or stone sea) is a rock landform resulting from the erosion of particular rock varieties caused by freezing-thawing cycles in periglacial conditions during the last Ice Age.

The actual formation of stone runs involved five processes: weathering, solifluction, frost heaving, frost sorting, and washing.  The stone runs are essentially different from moraines, rock glaciers, and rock flows or other rock phenomena involving the actual flow of rock blocks under stress that is sufficient to break down the cement or to cause crushing of the angularities and points of the boulders.  By contrast, the stone run boulders are fixed quite stably, providing for safer climbing and crossing of the run.

Stone runs are accumulations of boulders with no finer material between them. In the Falklands, they occur on slopes of between 1 and 10 degrees, and are the product of mass-movement and stone sorting during past periods of cold climate. They everywhere occur in association with poorly sorted, clay-rich solifluction deposits.

Geographic distribution

The Falkland Islands and Vitosha Mountain (Bulgaria), both have an abundance of large stone runs. The highly specific combination of particular climatic conditions and rock varieties that existed there during the Quaternary explains both the formation of stone runs in those two territories and their absence in areas with otherwise comparable nature conditions.

For instance, while the present Falklands climate is quite similar to that of Scotland, the latter was completely glacial rather than periglacial during the relevant period, which would not allow for the formation of stone runs.  On the other hand, due to geological and other specifics of the southern temperate and sub-Antarctic territories with climatic history similar to that of the Falklands (Prince Edward Islands, Crozet Islands, Kerguelen Islands, Macquarie Island, Campbell Islands, or nearby Tierra del Fuego and Patagonia), none of them features landforms comparable to the Falklands stone runs.

However, even on that small territory the stone runs exist along with screes and other rock landforms, suggesting that the right periglacial conditions and rock composition are necessary but not sufficient conditions for the formation of stone runs.

Other examples of stone runs occur in England, including at the Stiperstones, Shropshire. They are also known in Pennsylvania. Small examples are probably very widespread where solifluction deposits contain large concentrations of frost-resistant rock blocks.

Falklands stone runs

The Falklands stone runs are made up of hard quartzite blocks.  They are more widespread and larger on East Falkland, especially in the Wickham Heights area where the largest of them extend over 5 km in length.  Those on West Falkland and the minor islands are fewer in number and of smaller dimensions.  Darwin's "great valley of fragments", subsequently renamed Princes Street Stone Run after Edinburgh's Princes Street that was cobbled at the time, occupies a 4 km long and 400 m wide shallow valley trending east-west.  The feature is situated off the road to Port Louis, some 20 km northwest of Stanley.

An early description of the Falklands stone runs was given in Antoine-Joseph Pernety’s account of his exploration of the islands during the 1763–64 French expedition under Louis Antoine de Bougainville, which established the Port Saint Louis settlement on East Falkland.  While crossing the neck between Baye Accaron (Berkeley Sound) and Baye Marville (Salvador Water) he described in detail two particular stone features he called ‘City Gates’ and ‘Amphitheatre’:

Pernety's observations were continued by young Charles Darwin, who visited the Falklands in 1833 and 1834:

Vitosha stone rivers

The Vitosha stone rivers, located in Bulgaria, are situated in the middle and upper mountain belts at elevation over 1,000 m above sea level.  Among the largest ones are those on the Subalpine plateaus surrounding the summit Cherni Vrah (2290 m), and in the upper courses of the mountain's rivers, extending over 2 km at the Zlatnite Mostove (‘Golden Bridges’) site in the upper course of Vladayska River, and over 1 km in the case of Boyanska, Bistritsa, and Struma Rivers.  Golyamata Gramada (Big Pile) Stone River in Vitoshka Bistritsa River valley is up to 300 m wide, and other stone run formations sprawl even wider on the mountain slopes, notably the ‘stone sea’ at the northern foot of Kamen Del Peak.  Some boulders are several dozen to over three hundred cubic metres in volume, and sixty to several hundred tons weight.

While Vitosha was known already to Thucydides, Aristotle, and Pliny the Elder in Antiquity, its first modern geological survey was made as late as 1836 by the German-French-Austrian scientist Ami Boué who incidentally had studied medicine at Edinburgh University just a few years before Charles Darwin did.  Since Boué, it took several decades of argument to conclude that Vitosha stone rivers were not true glacial moraines as some believed.

Exploited in the past as a source of cobblestone material for Sofia’s streets, nowadays the stone rivers are protected by law.  Special permission has been granted in exceptional cases for the removal of some material for sculpture artwork.  As a nature park situated right by the outskirts of Sofia (Cherni Vrah itself being 16 km away from the central square of Sofia), Vitosha is a major tourist destination.  Some 1.5 million people from dozens of nations visit the mountain annually, and the stone rivers feature high on the list of tourist attractions.

See also
 Blockfield
 Scree field
 Zlatnite Mostove
 Golyamata Gramada

References

External links

 Image Gallery of Zlatnite Mostove Stone Run
 Large Collection of Images from Stone Runs in Bulgaria

Google views
 Princes Street Stone Run, Falkland Islands
 Zlatnite Mostove (‘Golden Bridges’) Stone River, Vitosha Mountain, Bulgaria

Periglacial landforms
Landforms of the Falkland Islands
Rock formations of Bulgaria